Zieleniewo  is a village in the administrative district of Gmina Bierzwnik, within Choszczno County, West Pomeranian Voivodeship, in north-western Poland. 

Notable residents
 Günter Lörke (born 1935), German cyclist

References

Zieleniewo